The Baptist Association of Belize is a Baptist Christian denomination in Belize. It is affiliated with the Baptist World Alliance. The headquarters is in Belize City.

History
The Baptist Association of Belize has its origins in a British mission of the BMS World Mission in 1822. It is officially founded in 1976. According to a denomination census released in 2020, it claimed 52 churches and 4,000 members.

See also

 Bible
 Born again
 Baptist beliefs
 Worship service (evangelicalism)
 Jesus Christ
 Believers' Church

References

Baptist denominations in the Caribbean